Pauridiantha talbotii, synonym Pauridiantha venusta, is a species of plant in the family Rubiaceae. It is native to Cameroon, Equatorial Guinea, Gabon and Nigeria.

Conservation
Pauridiantha venusta was assessed as "vulnerable" in the 2004 IUCN Red List, where it is said to be native only to Cameroon and Gabon, being found in subtropical or tropical moist lowland forests. , P. venusta was regarded as a synonym of Pauridiantha talbotii, which has a wider distribution, being found also in Equatorial Guinea and Nigeria.

References

talbotii
Flora of Cameroon
Flora of Equatorial Guinea
Flora of Gabon
Flora of Nigeria
Taxonomy articles created by Polbot